Statistics of American Professional Soccer League in season 1993.

History
In 1993, the league added three teams from Canada. The Canadian Soccer League had collapsed at the end of the 1992 season and the Vancouver 86ers and Toronto Blizzard along with a new club the Montreal Impact moved to the APSL. Vancouver topped the regular season standings, but fell in the playoff semifinals to the Los Angeles Salsa. In the other semifinal, the Colorado Foxes defeated the Tampa Bay Rowdies. Although the Foxes had a better record than the Salsa, the championship game took place in Los Angeles because the Foxes home stadium of Englewood High School had a homecoming football game the night of the championship.

In 1993 before the USSF chose MLS as Division 1, a couple teams had significant capital backing, had local TV and radio deals, and many of the players were US national team hopefuls or Canadian internationals.

Regular season
The competition was a single table on the league principle with a balanced schedule home and away where each of the seven teams plays the other six four times. The league`s regular season was played over twenty weeks, beginning April 30 and concluding Sept. 12. The top four in the table qualified for a single-elimination tournament held in September. The league was a generally close competition, given the points system adopted all teams were still in the playoff race into early August or about 70% of the season. The points system included 6pts for a win, 4pts for a shootout win, 2pts for a shootout loss, and bonus points for goals to a maximum of three. If the game was tied, then instead of following FIFA rules of two 15-minute extra halves followed by penalty kicks, the APSL did two 7.5 minute extra halves followed by the NASL shootout. The shootout consisted of the player starting 35 yards from the net, goalkeeper in net, and five seconds for the player to score (essentially a timed five second break-away skills competition). Game day rosters had to have eleven of the eighteen as domestic players.

Playoffs

Bracket

Semifinal 1

Semifinal 2

Final

Points leaders

Honors
 MVP: Paulinho
 Leading goal scorer: Paulinho
 Leading goalkeeper: Jim St. Andre
 Rookie of the Year: Jason De Vos
 Coach of the Year: Ken Fogarty
First Team All League
Goalkeeper: Paul Dolan
Defenders: Robin Fraser, Danny Pena, Mark Watson, Patrice Ferri
Midfielders: Paulinho, Ivor Evans, Paul Dougherty, Ted Eck
Forwards: Taifour Diané, Paul Wright
Second Team All League
Goalkeeper: Ian Feuer
Defenders: Jason De Vos, Steve MacDonald, Kim Roentved, Mark Santel
Midfielders: Chad Ashton, Bryan Haynes, Pierre Morice, Steve Trittschuh
Forwards: Domenic Mobilio, Hector Marinaro

References

External links
 The Year in American Soccer - 1993
 USA - A-League (American Professional Soccer League) (RSSSF)

APSL/A-League seasons
1
1993 in Canadian soccer